Alice King Chatham (March 28, 1908 – July 8, 1989) was an American sculptor who worked for the United States Air Force, NASA, and their contractors to design helmets, oxygen masks and other personal protective equipment. Equipment she designed was used both on humans and on a variety of animal test subjects.

Career

Wright-Patterson Air Force Base 
Alice King was a graduate of the Dayton Art Institute. In 1942, she was contacted by officials at the Wright Patterson Air Force Base (WPAFB) near Dayton, Ohio to help design breathing masks for pilots. They sought her out because they wanted someone with a sculpture background to be involved with the design. She began work at the Aero Medical Laboratory at WPAFB, where she helped design and build the first successful pressurized breath masks for pilots operating planes above . The pressurized mask was important to keep pilots from passing out at high altitude. Her work improved upon an earlier design by Dr. James P. Henry of the University of California that had not met the specifications needed by the Air Force.

X-plane projects 
King was assigned to work on the X-1 project that resulted in Chuck Yeager's accomplishment of the first transsonic flight. These improvements were incorporated into the 1946 Army model S-1 flight suits built by the David Clark Company. Although several sources have reported that Chuck Yeager was wearing this S-1 suit during his first record-setting first transsonic flight, Yeager said that he wore only a regular flight suit and not a pressure suit for that effort; King Chatham's exact contributions materials used in the X-plane program are unclear.

Space program 
Following her work for the Air Force, King Chatham went on to work for NASA and its contractor the Douglas Aircraft Company on projects for the space program. She designed the oxygen mask and harness used by Albert II, the rhesus monkey who was the first monkey and first mammal in space, during his June 14, 1949 flight. She also developed pressurized suits and helmets for the chimpanzees who were used to test ejection seats as part of Project Whoosh. In addition to these primates, King Chatham designed a suit for the St. Bernard used to test high-altitude parachutes. King Chatham's continued to work on designs for humans as well as animal subjects. She worked on the Sierra Sam early crash-test dummy. For Project Mercury, the first human spaceflight program in the United States, she made casts of the crew members' heads to create custom-fitted masks and helmets for each astronaut. Her work for the space program also included the development of stretch knit garments and a bed for use in space. In 1964, she appeared on the television program To Tell the Truth, and was asked about her experiences designing for space.

King Chatham applied her design experience in the space program to terrestrial science as well. She founded the Alice King Chatham Medical Arts, a company that manufactured harnesses, restraints, and other physiological equipment for both human and animal subjects in research environments.

Death 
Alice King Chatham died at a nursing home in Marion, Ohio, on 8 July 1989. She was preceded in death by her husband, Joshua D. Chatham.

References 

1908 births
1989 deaths
American women sculptors
NASA people
20th-century American sculptors
20th-century American women artists
United States Air Force civilians
Female United States Air Force personnel